Shi Hui (165–227 CE), also known by his Vietnamese name Sĩ Huy, was an official of the state of Eastern Wu during the Three Kingdoms period of China. 

Shi Hui was the third son of Shi Xie. Following his father's death in 226, he succeeded as the Administrator of Jiaozhi Commandery. The Wu emperor, Sun Quan, thought Jiaozhi was too far to control, so he split Jiaozhi into three Guangzhou, Jiaozhi and Jiaozhou. Lü Dai and Dai Liang (戴良) were appointed as Administrator of Guangzhou and Jiaozhou respectively. In the same time, Shi Hui was appointed as Administrator of Jiuzhen ordered to leave Jiaozhi, while Chen Shi (陳時), a close aide of Sun Quan, was to replace him as the Administrator of Jiaozhi.

Hearing about the new arrangements, Shi was discontent. He sent troops to prevent Dai Liang and Chen Shi from entering his area. Lü Dai was ordered to put down his rebellion. Shi Kuang, a cousin of Shi Hui, was sent to persuade him to surrender. Lü promised that his life would be spared. Shi Hui opened the gate and submitted to Lü Dai. Lü Dai set a trap and had he and his brothers executed. Their heads were sent to Wuchang.

See also
List of people of the Three Kingdoms
 Chen Shou
 Records of the Three Kingdoms

References 

165 births
227 deaths
Eastern Wu generals
Vietnamese monarchs
Shi Xie and associates
Executed Eastern Wu people
People executed by Eastern Wu
Executed Three Kingdoms people
People executed by a Three Kingdoms state by decapitation
Executed Vietnamese people
3rd-century executions